Mary 'Betty' Newmarsh Woolcock née Ladler (1914–2004) was an English artist and illustrator, most notable for her illustrations in books written by Enid Blyton.

Life and work 
Betty Ladler was born in Hendon, Middlesex in 1914. She was a prolific illustrator predominantly of children's books for the publisher Blackie & Son LTD. Most of her life was spent in England but she travelled extensively and drew images taken from her time in the Middle and Far East and the Swiss Alps. Her home was in the village of Coombe, near Wooton under Edge, South Gloucestershire where she died in 2004.

Exhibitions 
Ladler exhibited Saloon Bar at the Royal Academy in 1944, Flower Study in 1945 and Flowers in Sunlight in 1947.

Partial bibliography 
The Sound of Pens (written by Ruth Leaver)
Alison and the Witch's Cave (1956) (written by Shelia Stuart)
Blackie's Girl School Story Omnibus (1960)
Study Number Six (1957) (written by Nancy Breary)
Sally Again (1959) (written by Dorita Fairlie Bruce)
Flora at Kilroinn (1956) (written by Mabel Esther Allan (1956)
The Secret of the Silver Bottle (1957) (written by Caleb Hawker)
Third Holiday Book (1948) (written by Enid Blyton)
Tenth Holiday Book (1955) (written by Enid Blyton)
Eleventh Holiday Book (1956) (written by Enid Blyton)
Enid Blyton's Magazine (1955) (written by Enid Blyton)
'Do My Best' Brownie Book (1960) (written by Freda Collins)
The Hand of the Law (1970) (written by Granville Calland Thornley)
Morning Light (1957) (written by Stella Mead)
Collins Girls' Annual (1958)
The Pearl Book of Girl Guide Stories
Noel Streatfeild's Ballet Annual (1957) (written by Noel Streatfeild)
Polly of Primrose Hill (1956) (written by Kathleen O' Farrell)

References 

1914 births
2004 deaths
20th-century English painters
20th-century English women artists
British women illustrators
English women painters
English illustrators
English children's book illustrators
Enid Blyton illustrators
Landscape artists